This article lists events from the year 2021 in Mozambique.

Incumbents
President: Filipe Nyusi
Prime Minister: Carlos Agostinho do Rosário

Events
Ongoing – COVID-19 pandemic in Mozambique

January to March
January 14 – COVID-19 pandemic: The government tightens health restrictions as new cases rise to 422 per day. Two hundred five people have died from COVID-19 since the beginning of the pandemic in March 2020.
January 16 – The Bazaruto Archipelago National Park (PNAB) reports a 47.5% decrease in illegal fishing from 2019 to 2020.
February 8 – The government conservation department and conservation groups announce the successful reintroduction into the wild of two male and two female spotted hyenas in Zinave National Park for the first time in forty years.
March 24 – Jihadist groups attack Palma, Cabo Delgado Province,  from gas fields worth US$60 billion.
March 27 – A British expatriate is reported killed in an attack by jihadists on Palma, according to The Daily Telegraph. Dozens of expatriates are reported killed, and there are reports of beheadings of children as young as eleven years old.
March 31 – More than 5,300 displaced persons seek refuge in Cabo Delgado Province after ISIS attacks in Palma. Forty-five people flee to Tanzania.

Deaths
January 29 – Calane da Silva, 75, writer and journalist, COVID-19.
February 22 – Daviz Simango, 57, politician (Democratic Movement of Mozambique), mayor of Beira; complications from COVID-19 and diabetes

See also

2020–21 South-West Indian Ocean cyclone season
2021–22 South-West Indian Ocean cyclone season
COVID-19 pandemic in Africa
Islamic State of Iraq and the Levant
Al-Shabaab (militant group)

References

 
2020s in Mozambique
Years of the 21st century in Mozambique
Mozambique